Psilochalcis is a genus of chalcidid wasps in the family Chalcididae. There are at least 20 described species in Psilochalcis.

Species
These 22 species belong to the genus Psilochalcis:

 Psilochalcis benoisti (Steffan, 1948) c g
 Psilochalcis brevialata Grissell & Johnson, 2001 c g
 Psilochalcis carinigena (Cameron, 1907) c g
 Psilochalcis clypeata (Boucek, 1952) g
 Psilochalcis deceptor (Grissell & Schauff, 1981) c g
 Psilochalcis festiva (Steffan, 1962) g
 Psilochalcis frontalis Askew, 1994 c g
 Psilochalcis hespenheidei (Boucek, 1984) c g
 Psilochalcis immaculata (Rossi, 1792) c g
 Psilochalcis keralensis Narendran, 1989 c g
 Psilochalcis ligustica (Masi, 1929) g
 Psilochalcis longigena Kieffer, 1905 c g
 Psilochalcis mirabilis (Boucek, 1952) g
 Psilochalcis nigerrima (Masi, 1929) g
 Psilochalcis oranensis (Boucek, 1952) g
 Psilochalcis rufitarsis (Illiger, 1807) c g
 Psilochalcis soudanensis (Steffan, 1951) c g
 Psilochalcis subaenea (Masi, 1929) c g
 Psilochalcis subarmata (Forster, 1855) g
 Psilochalcis tenuicornis Askew, 2001 c g
 Psilochalcis threa (Grissell & Schauff, 1981) c g
 Psilochalcis usta (Grissell & Schauff, 1981) c g

Data sources: i = ITIS, c = Catalogue of Life, g = GBIF, b = Bugguide.net

References

Further reading

External links

 

Parasitic wasps
Chalcidoidea